Wallis and Futuna, officially the Territory of the Wallis and Futuna Islands, is a French island collectivity in the South Pacific, situated between Tuvalu to the northwest, Fiji to the southwest, Tonga to the southeast, Samoa to the east, and Tokelau to the northeast.

Mata Utu is its capital and largest city. It had a population of 11,558 at the 2018 census (down from 14,944 at the 2003 census). The territory is made up of three main volcanic tropical islands and a number of tiny islets.

Since 28 March 2003, Wallis and Futuna has been a French overseas collectivity (collectivité d'outre-mer, or COM). Between 1961 and 2003, it had the status of a French overseas territory (territoire d'outre-mer, or TOM). Its official name did not change when its status changed.

History

Early humans
The earliest signs of human habitation on these islands are artifacts characteristic of the Lapita culture, dating roughly to between 850 and 800 BCE. The islands served as natural stopover points for boat traffic, mostly between Fiji and Samoa. During Tongan invasions in the 15th and 16th centuries, the islands defended themselves with varying levels of resistance, but also accepted varying degrees of assimilation. Futuna retained more of its pre-Tongan cultural features, while Wallis underwent greater fundamental changes in its society, language, and culture. The original inhabitants built forts and other identifiable structures on the islands (many of which are in ruins), some of which are still partially intact. Oral history and archaeological evidence suggests that the Tongan invaders re-occupied and modified some of these structures. The oral history also preserves a cultural memory of relationships between Samoa and Futuna that are so longstanding, they are described in the islanders' origin stories.

European settlements
Futuna was first put on European maps by Willem Schouten and Jacob Le Maire, during their circumnavigation of the globe, in 1616. They named the islands of Futuna "Hoornse Eylanden", after the Dutch town of Hoorn where they hailed from. This was later translated into French, as "Isles de Horne." The Wallis Islands are named after the British explorer Samuel Wallis, who sailed past them in 1767, after being the first European to visit Tahiti. The French were the first Europeans to settle in the territory, with the arrival of French missionaries in 1837, who converted the population to Roman Catholicism. Pierre Chanel, canonized in 1954, is a major patron saint of the island of Futuna and of the region.

On 5 April 1842, the missionaries asked for the protection of France, after the uprising of part of the local population. On 5 April 1887, the queen of Uvea (of the traditional chiefdom of Wallis) signed a treaty, officially establishing a French protectorate. The kings of Sigave and Alo (on the islands of Futuna and Alofi) also signed a treaty establishing a French protectorate, on 16 February 1888. From that moment, the islands were officially under the authority of the French colony of New Caledonia.

In 1917, the three traditional kingdoms of Uvea, Sigave, and Alo were annexed by France, integrated into the colony of Wallis and Futuna, and remained under the authority of the colony of New Caledonia.

World War II

During World War II, the islands' administration was briefly pro-Vichy, until a Free French corvette from New Caledonia deposed the regime, on 26 May 1942. Units of the US Marine Corps later landed on Wallis, on 29 May 1942.

Overseas territory
In 1959, the inhabitants of the islands voted to become a separate French overseas territory, effective since 29 July 1961, thus ending their subordination to New Caledonia.

In 2005, the 50th king of Uvea, Tomasi Kulimoetoke II, faced being deposed after giving sanctuary to his grandson who was convicted of manslaughter. The king claimed his grandson should be judged by tribal law rather than by the French penal system. As a result, there were riots in the streets involving the king's supporters, who were victorious over attempts to replace the king. Two years later, Tomasi Kulimoetoke died on 7 May 2007. The state was in a six-month period of mourning, during which mentioning a successor was forbidden. On 25 July 2008, Kapiliele Faupala was installed as king despite protests from some of the royal clans. He was deposed in 2014. A new king, Patalione Kanimoa, was eventually installed in Uvea in 2016; Lino Leleivai in Alo on Futuna succeeded after Filipo Katoa had abdicated, and Eufenio Takala succeeded Polikalepo Kolivai in Sigave. The French president at the time, François Hollande, attended the installation ceremony.

Governance and law

The territory is divided into three traditional kingdoms (royaumes coutumiers): Uvea, on the island of Wallis, Sigave, on the western part of the island of Futuna, and Alo, on the eastern part of the island of Futuna and on the uninhabited island of Alofi (only Uvea is further subdivided, into three districts):

The capital of the collectivity is Mata Utu on the island of Uvéa, the most populous of the Wallis Islands. As an overseas collectivity of France, it is governed under the French constitution of 28 September 1958, and has universal suffrage for those over 18 years of age. The French president is elected by popular vote for a five-year term; the high administrator is appointed by the French president on the advice of the French Ministry of the Interior; the presidents of the Territorial Government and the Territorial Assembly are elected by the members of the assembly. The most recent election was held on 20 March 2022.

As of 2021, the head of state is President Emmanuel Macron of France, as represented by Administrator-Superior Thierry Queffelec. The president of the Territorial Assembly has been Petelo Hanisi since 11 December 2013. The Council of the Territory consists of three kings (monarchs of the three pre-colonial kingdoms) and three members appointed by the high administrator on the advice of the Territorial Assembly.

The legislative branch consists of the unicameral 20-member Territorial Assembly or Assemblée territoriale. Its members are elected by popular vote, and serve five-year terms. Wallis and Futuna elects one senator to the French Senate and one deputy to the French National Assembly.

Criminal justice is generally governed by French law and administered by a tribunal of first resort in Mata Utu; appeals from that tribunal are decided by the Court of Appeal in Nouméa, New Caledonia. However, in non-criminal cases (civil-law disputes), the three traditional kingdoms administer justice according to customary law.

The territory participates in the Franc Zone, and is both a permanent member of the Secretariat of the Pacific Community and an observer at the Pacific Islands Forum.

Geography and climate

Wallis and Futuna is located about two-thirds of the way from Hawaii to New Zealand.

The territory includes the island of Uvéa (also called Wallis), which is the most populous; the island of Futuna; the virtually uninhabited island of Alofi; and 20 uninhabited islets.

The islands have a hot, rainy season from November to April, when tropical cyclones passing over them cause storms. Then they have a cool, dry season from May to October, caused by the southeast trade winds that predominate during those months. The average annual rainfall is between 2,500 and 3,000 millimetres (98–118  in), and rain is likely on at least 260 days per year. The average humidity is 80%.

Only 5% of the islands' land area consists of arable land; permanent crops cover another 20%. Deforestation is a serious problem: Only small portions of the original forests remain, largely because the inhabitants use wood as their main fuel source, and, as a result, the mountainous terrain of Futuna is particularly susceptible to erosion. The island of Alofi lacks natural freshwater resources, so it has no permanent settlements.

Volcanic activity during the mid-Pleistocene created numerous volcanic crater lakes on Uvea (Wallis Island). The names of some of them are: Lalolalo, Lano, Lanutavake, Lanutuli, Lanumaha, Kikila, and Alofivai.

Wallis and Futuna is part of the Fiji tropical moist forests terrestrial ecoregion.

Islands

Flora and fauna

Economy

The GDP of Wallis and Futuna in 2005 was US$188 million (at market exchange rates). 
The territory's economy consists mostly of traditional subsistence agriculture, with about 80% of the labor force earning its livelihood from agriculture (coconuts and vegetables), livestock (mostly pigs), and fishing. About 4% of the population is employed in government. Additional revenue comes from French government subsidies, licensing of fishing rights to Japan and South Korea, import taxes, and remittances from expatriate workers in New Caledonia, French Polynesia, and France. Industries include copra, handicrafts, fishing, and lumber. Agricultural products include coconuts, breadfruit, yams, taro, bananas, pigs, and fish.
Exports include copra, chemicals, and fish.

There is a single bank in the territory, Banque de Wallis-et-Futuna, established in 1991. It is a subsidiary of BNP Paribas. There had previously been a branch of Banque Indosuez at Mata Utu. It had opened in 1977, but was closed in 1989, leaving the territory without any bank for two years.

Demographics

Population

The total population of the territory at the July 2018 census was 11,558 (72.1% on the island of Wallis, 27.9% on the island of Futuna), down from 14,944 at the July 2003 census. The vast majority of the population are of Polynesian ethnicity, with a small minority who were born in Metropolitan France or are of French descent.

Lack of economic opportunities has, since the 1950s, been impelling many young Wallisians and Futunians to migrate to the more prosperous French territory of New Caledonia, where, as French citizens, they are legally entitled to settle and work. Since the mid-2000s, emigration has surged in response to political tensions on the main island of Wallis (Uvea), that have arisen from a feud between rival aristocratic clans, who are supporting competing kings. Emigrants have begun settling, not only in New Caledonia, but also much farther away, in Metropolitan France. At the 2019 New Caledonian census, 22,520 residents of New Caledonia (whether born in New Caledonia or in Wallis and Futuna) reported their ethnicity as "Wallisian and Futunian". This is almost double the total population of Wallis and Futuna.

Historical population

Languages

According to the 2018 census, among people 14 y/o and older, 59.1% reported Wallisian as the language they speak the most at home (down from 60.2% in 2008), 27.9% reported Futunan (down from 29.9% in 2008), and 12.7% reported French (up from 9.7% in 2008). On Wallis Island, the languages most spoken at home were Wallisian (82.2%, down from 86.1% in 2008), French (15.6%, up from 12.1% in 2008), and Futunan (1.9%, up from 1.5% in 2008). On Futuna, the languages most spoken at home were Futunan (94.5%, down from 94.9% in 2008), French (5.3%, up from 4.2% in 2008), and Wallisian (0.2%, down from 0.8% in 2008).

At the 2018 census, 90.5% of people 14 y/o and older could speak, read and write either Wallisian or Futunan (up from 88.5% at the 2008 census), and 7.2% had no knowledge of either Wallisian or Futunan (same percentage as at the 2008 census).

Among those 14 y/o and older, 84.2% could speak, read and write French in 2018 (up from 78.2% at the 2008 census), and 11.8% reported that they had no knowledge of French (down from 17.3% at the 2008 census). On Wallis Island, 85.1% of people age 14 or older could speak, read and write French (up from 81.1% at the 2008 census), and 10.9% reported that they had no knowledge of French (down from 14.3% at the 2008 census). On Futuna, 81.9% of people age 14 or older could speak, read and write French (up from 71.6% at the 2008 census), and 14.0% had no knowledge of French (down from 24.3% at the 2008 census).

Religion

The overwhelming majority (99%) of the people in Wallis and Futuna are Catholics, with the island having been evangelized in the 19th century by Fr Peter Chanel, SM. They are served by their own Diocese of Wallis and Futuna, with a see at Mata Utu, a suffragan diocese of the Metropolitan Archdiocese of Nouméa (New Caledonia).

Culture 

The culture of Wallis and Futuna is Polynesian, and is similar to the cultures of its neighbouring nations Samoa and Tonga. The Wallisian and Futunan cultures are very similar to each other in language, dance, cuisine and modes of celebration.

Fishing and agriculture are the traditional occupations, and most people live in traditional oval, thatch fale houses. Kava is a popular beverage brewed in the two islands, as in much else of Polynesia. It also serves as a traditional offering in rituals. Highly detailed tapa cloth art is a specialty of Wallis and Futuna.

Uvea Museum Association is a private museum that holds a collection of objects that record the history of the Second World War in the territory. It is located in Mata Utu shopping centre and in 2009 was open by appointment.

Transport and communications
In 2018, the territory had 3,132 telephones in use, one AM radio station, and two television broadcast stations. Communication costs are up to ten times higher  than in western countries. The island of Futuna has only  of roadways, none of which are paved. The territory has two main ports, in the harbours at Mata Utu and Leava (on the island of Futuna). These ports support its merchant marine fleet, which comprises three ships (two passenger ships and a petroleum tanker), totaling 92,060 GRT or 45,881 tonnes. There are two airports: Hihifo Airport, on Wallis, which has a  paved runway; and Pointe Vele Airport, on Futuna, which has a  runway. Now the only commercial flights to and from Wallis are operated by Caledonia-based Aircalin, which has an office in Mata Utu. There are currently no commercial boat operators.

Newspapers 
The French High Commission published a local newspaper in the 1970s, Nouvelles de Wallis et de Futuna. Today, news is available online via a local program broadcast by the French television network La Première.

Education
There are 18 primary schools in the territory, 12 on Wallis and six on Futuna, with a combined total of over 5200 students.

The territory has six junior high schools and one senior high school/sixth-form college.
Junior high schools (collèges) in Wallis: Mataotama de Malae, Alofivai de Lano, Vaimoana de Lavegahau, and Tinemui de Teesi
Junior high schools in Futuna: Fiua de Sigave and Sisia d'Ono
The senior high school/sixth-form college is Lycée d'État de Wallis et Futuna on Wallis

There is also an agricultural high school.

Healthcare

As of 2018, yaws was endemic in the area, but cases were not being reported to the WHO eradication programme.

Healthcare is available free of charge in two hospitals on Uvea and Futuna islands. There are also three dispensaries.

Environment
Deforestation is a major concern in the region as only small portions of the original forests remain due to the continued use of wood as the main source of fuel. Consequently, the mountainous terrain of Futuna has become prone to erosion. There are no permanent settlements on Alofi due to the lack of natural freshwater resources, and the presence of infertile soil on the islands of Uvea and Futuna further reduces the agricultural productivity.

See also

Outline of Wallis and Futuna
Administrative divisions of France
French overseas departments and territories
Islands controlled by France in the Indian and Pacific oceans
Vicariate Apostolic of Oriental Oceania

References

External links 

Official website of the French Administrateur supérieur de Wallis-et-Futuna 
Wallis-et-Futuna La 1ère – Online news

GigaCatholic
Map of Wallis and Futuna, with district boundaries
Information about Wallis and Futuna 

 
Dependent territories in Oceania
Overseas collectivities of France
Former colonies in Oceania
Geography of Polynesia
10th-century establishments in Oceania
States and territories established in 1961
1961 establishments in Oceania
1961 establishments in France
French-speaking countries and territories